Grand Concourse can refer to:

 Grand Concourse (Bronx), a boulevard in New York City
 Grand Concourse (St. John's), an integrated walkway network in Newfoundland and Labrador
 Grand Concourse (restaurant), an eatery owned by Landry's, Inc. in Pittsburgh

See also
 Grand Concourse Apartments, in Miami
 Grand Concourse buses